These are the official results of the Women's Long Jump event at the 1997 IAAF World Championships in Athens, Greece. There were a total number of 44 participating athletes, with two qualifying groups and the final held on Saturday August 6, 1997.

Medalists

Records

Results

Qualifying round
Held on Thursday 1997-08-07

Final

See also
 1994 Women's European Championships Long Jump (Helsinki)
 1995 Women's World Championships Long Jump (Gothenburg)
 1996 Women's Olympic Long Jump (Atlanta)
 1998 Women's European Championships Long Jump (Budapest)
 1999 Women's World Championships Long Jump (Seville)

References
 Results

L
Long jump at the World Athletics Championships
1997 in women's athletics